Companhia Brasileira de Alumínio (CBA; Brazilian Aluminium Company) is the largest aluminium producer in Brazil having a total annual production of around 480,000 tonnes.

It is headquartered in the city of São Paulo.

History 

Established on June 4, 1955, CBA was the first aluminium plant in Brazil producing 4.000 tonnes/year but after fifty years in 2005 the company had a producing capacity of 400,000 tonnes/year.

Now the company has a large distribution chain all across Brazil including a sea terminal in the Port of Santos.

Other businesses

Mining 
CBA has some bauxite mines in Poços de Caldas.  After acquiring a 10% stake in  mining company Mineração Rio do Norte, CBA now holds bauxite mines in the South-East part of Parana State and has another mine in the municipality of Cataguases and Itamarati de Minas in Minas Gerais State.  There is another mine "Miraí" due for opening in 2007 which alone will produce 3 million tonnes of bauxite per year.

Electric power 
The company produces 60% of the energy in the 18 hydroelectric power plants it owns all over Brazil and has around 13,000 clients.

External links 
 Home page

Aluminium companies of Brazil
Aluminium smelters
1955 establishments in Brazil
Votorantim Group